Glenn Spearman (February 14, 1947 – October 8, 1998) was an American jazz tenor saxophonist. He was associated with free jazz and experimental music.

Spearman was active in Oakland, California, in the late 1960s but moved to Paris in 1972 and founded the band Emergency with bassist Bob Reid. This group recorded two albums, performed on radio and television in France, and appeared at the festival in Avignon. He was artist-in-residence in Rotterdam and toured through Europe before returning to the United States in 1978.

Following his return he worked in the Cecil Taylor Unit, primarily out of San Francisco though he performed on both sides of the Atlantic through the 1980s. In the 1990s, he led the Double Trio which included Larry Ochs, William Winant, and Lisle Ellis as sidemen; this ensemble played at the Monterey Jazz Festival and the Vancouver International Jazz Festival. They were commissioned for a piece by the Move Dance Theater which was performed at Laney College. He worked with the Rova Saxophone Quartet and with filmmaker Lynn Marie Kirby in addition to teaching at Mills College. He died of cancer in 1998.

Discography

As leader or co-leader
 Night After Night (Musa-Physics, 1981)
 Utterance (Cadence, 1990)
 Mystery Project (Black Saint, 1993)
 Smokehouse (Black Saint, 1994)
 The Fields (Black Saint, 1996)
 Surya: Stretching the Edge (Surya, 1996)
 Surya: Up (Surya, 1996)
 Th (CIMP, 1997)
 Let it Go (Red Toucan, 1997)
 First and Last (Eremite, 1999)
 Working with the Elements with Dominic Duval (CIMP, 1999)
 Blues for Falasha (Tzadik, 1999)
 Free Worlds (Black Saint, 2000)

With Emergency
Homage to Peace (America, 1973)
Bob Reid Presents: The Best of Emergency (Kwela, 1976)

With Marco Eneidi
 Creative Music Orchestra (Music & Arts, 1997)

With Trio Hurricane
 Suite of Winds (Black Saint, 1986)
 Live at Fire in the Valley (Eremite, 1997)

As sideman
With Raphe Malik
 21st Century Texts (FMP, 1992)
 Sirens Sweet & Slow (Out Sounds, 1994)
 The Short Form (Eremite, 1997)
 Companions (Eremite, 2002)

With others
 Pipe Dreams, Figure 8 (Rova Saxophone Quartet x 2) (1994)
 Elevations, Lisle Ellis (1995)
 Marco Eneidi & the Jungle Orchestra, Marco Eneidi (1996)
 Mindfulness,  William Hooker (Knitting Factory, 1997)
 Live at Radio Valencia with Marco Eneidi, William Parker, Jackson Krall (Botticelli)

References

 Rick Lopez, Sessionography.

1947 births
1998 deaths
20th-century American saxophonists
American jazz saxophonists
American male saxophonists
CIMP artists
20th-century American male musicians
American male jazz musicians
Music & Arts artists
Black Saint/Soul Note artists
Cadence Jazz Records artists
Tzadik Records artists